Stack-o-Tracks is an instrumental album release by The Beach Boys containing backing tracks to fifteen of their songs spanning their career to that point. As it was issued during one of their lowest commercial ebbs in the U.S., Stack-o-Tracks became the first Beach Boys album to fail to reach the US or UK charts. Until 1992's Summer in Paradise, it would remain their only official release to have this distinction.

The US versions of the album included a booklet with the bass lines, lead lines, chords and lyrics (to sing along with), whereas European editions contained just the lyrics and a different cover. Stack-o-Tracks quickly disappeared and was out of print for two decades.  In 1990, Capitol Records re-issued it on CD, and again in 2001 - both releases without the booklet that accompanied the vinyl edition.

Stack-o-Tracks was only available in Duophonic, or fake stereo.

Track listing

Beach Boys' Party! / Stack-O-Tracks bonus tracks

In 1990, Stack-o-Tracks was paired on CD with Beach Boys' Party!, with bonus instrumental tracks. While Stack-o-Tracks was originally available only in mono or Duophonic sound, the CD includes true stereo mixes of several tracks.

References

1968 albums
The Beach Boys albums
Capitol Records remix albums